Varnappakittu is an Indian Malayalam TV series directed by Binu Vallathooval. It premiered on Surya TV on 8 March 2021 and streams on Sun NXT. It was produced by Listin Stephen under the banner of Magic Frames. The show abruptly went off air on 21 May 2021 due to the COVID-19 pandemic and low TRP rating.

Plot 
Daya is an average girl whose dream is to become an established writer. She is the second daughter of Sidharth and Sreelatha. Elder daughter, Kshama is an employee at a company, while Sidharth runs a hand-loom showroom. In order to find time pursue her writing dreams while escaping her mother and sister's criticism, Daya spends most of her time at her father's showroom and helps him around the store. Daya's mother Sreelatha thinks that being married would be good for her daughter. Daya does not want to get married. As a result, her mother presents her with two options: take a corporate job like her sister, or get married and become a family wife. So she takes job in her sisters company there she falls in love with Pavan madhav,chairman's son later when he becomes the chairman intake as his father's goes to USA

Cast

Leads 
 Mansi Joshy as Daya Sidharth
 Bapin Bhaseer as Pavan Madhav
 Fazil Rihan as Naveen
 Abees as Pappaji
 K.P.A.C Sajeev as Sidharth
 Devi Ajith as Sreelatha
 Jishin Mohan as Mukunthan Unni
 Gayathri Mayura as Kshama Sidharth

Other Cast 
 Anna Chacko as Pammi
Praveen Prem as Jaggu
Gayathry Mayura as Kshema
Prabha R Krishnan as Ambiliamma
Aleena Tresa as Angel
 Sajna Firoz

Soundtrack

References 

2021 Indian television series debuts
Malayalam-language television shows
Surya TV original programming